Ministers of Mental Health are specific Government Ministers with a responsibility over mental health.

History 
Not many countries have dedicated ministers for mental health, however a minister with another name may be responsible for it.

By country

Australia 

 Minister for Families and Social Services, whose responsibilities include mental health – Senator Anne Ruston
Minister for Mental Health (Australian Capital Territory) – Emma Davidson MLA
Minister for Mental Health, Regional Youth and Women (New South Wales) – Bronwyn Taylor MLC
Minister for Health (Northern Territory), whose responsibilities include mental health – Natasha Fyles MLA
Minister for Health and Ambulance Services (Queensland), whose responsibilities include mental health – Yvette D'Ath MP
Minister for Health and Wellbeing (South Australia), whose responsibilities include mental health – Stephen Wade MLC
Minister for Mental Health and Wellbeing (Tasmania) – Jeremy Rockliff MP
Minister for Mental Health (Victoria) – James Merlino MP
 Minister for Mental Health (Western Australia) – Roger Cook MLA

Canada 

 Minister of Mental Health and Addictions – Carolyn Bennett MP

Ireland 

 Minister of State for Mental Health and Older People – Mary Butler TD

United Kingdom 

 Parliamentary Under-Secretary of State for Mental Health and Women's Health Strategy – Maria Caulfield MP
 Minister for Mental Health (Scotland) – Clare Haughey MSP

References

See also 

 Health minister

Health ministers
Mental health
Health-related lists